This table displays the top-rated primetime television series of the 1993–94 season as measured by Nielsen Media Research.

References

1993 in American television
1994 in American television
1993-related lists
1994-related lists
Lists of American television series